Lihons is a commune in the Somme department in Hauts-de-France in northern France.

Geography

Population

Places of interest
The tomb of Prince Murat.

Louis Marie Joachim Napoléon Michel Prince Murat was a descendant (a great-great grandson) of Napoleon’s brother-in-law, Joachim Murat, the first recipient of the title. He volunteered during World War I and joined the 5th infantry regiment of cuirassiers. He died on the western front in Lihons on 21 August 1916, aged 20 years. The monument was built by his family after the war and later transferred to the commune for maintenance (in 1961).

See also
Communes of the Somme department

References

External links

 

Communes of Somme (department)